Neospintharus is a genus of comb-footed spiders that was first described by H. Exline in 1950. It was synonymized with Argyrodes in 1962, but revalidated in 2004.

Species
 it contains thirteen species, found in the Caribbean, South America, Central America, Asia, Mexico, Turkey, the United States, and Canada:
Neospintharus baboquivari (Exline & Levi, 1962) – USA, Mexico
Neospintharus baekamensis Seo, 2010 – Korea
Neospintharus bicornis (O. Pickard-Cambridge, 1880) – Brazil
Neospintharus concisus (Exline & Levi, 1962) – Mexico
Neospintharus fur (Bösenberg & Strand, 1906) – China, Korea, Japan
Neospintharus furcatus (O. Pickard-Cambridge, 1894) – USA to El Salvador, Caribbean
Neospintharus nipponicus (Kumada, 1990) – China, Korea, Japan
Neospintharus obscurus (Keyserling, 1884) – Peru
Neospintharus parvus Exline, 1950 (type) – Panama to Ecuador
Neospintharus rioensis (Exline & Levi, 1962) – Brazil, Argentina
Neospintharus syriacus (O. Pickard-Cambridge, 1872) – Turkey, Lebanon, Israel
Neospintharus triangularis (Taczanowski, 1873) – Panama, French Guiana
Neospintharus trigonum (Hentz, 1850) – USA, Canada

In synonymy:
N. bifissus (F. O. Pickard-Cambridge, 1902) = Neospintharus furcatus (O. Pickard-Cambridge, 1894)
N. frontatus (Banks, 1908) = Neospintharus furcatus (O. Pickard-Cambridge, 1894)
N. gansuensis (Zhu, 1998) = Neospintharus fur (Bösenberg & Strand, 1906)
N. montanus (Keyserling, 1884) = Neospintharus obscurus (Keyserling, 1884)

See also
 List of Theridiidae species

References

Araneomorphae genera
Cosmopolitan spiders
Theridiidae